Miss Hong Kong Pageant 2019 (2019 香港小姐競選) was the 47th Miss Hong Kong Pageant held in TVB City on 8 September 2019. 10 delegates competed for the title. 

2018 Miss Hong Kong winner Hera Chan crowned her successor Carmaney Wong. 

Winner Carmaney Wong is set to represent Hong Kong at the 2020 Miss Chinese International Pageant, which has been postponed to a future date due to the COVID-19 pandemic. The pageant had an aquatic theme.

Results

Placements

Special Awards
These awards were given during the telecast of the pageant on August 26:
Miss Photogenic: Fei Wong
Miss Friendship: Blossom Chan

Delegates
The Miss Hong Kong 2019 delegates were:

Eliminated:

References
TVB - Miss Hong Kong Pageant 2019

Miss Hong Kong Pageants
2019 in Hong Kong
Hong Kong